Georg Eberhardter was an Austrian luger who competed from the late 1980s to the early 1990s. A natural track luger, he won the bronze medal in the men's doubles event at the 1990 FIL World Luge Natural Track Championships in Gsies, Italy.

Eberhardter also won a bronze medal in the men's doubles event at the 1991 FIL European Luge Natural Track Championships in Völs am Schlern, Italy.

References

External links
Natural track European Championships results 1970-2006.
Natural track World Championships results: 1979-2007

Austrian male lugers
Living people
Year of birth missing (living people)